Gentle On My Mind and Other Originals is an album by folk, country and bluegrass musician and songwriter John Hartford. It was released by RCA Victor in 1968. 

The album was recorded in RCA's "Nashville Sound" studio in Nashville, Tennessee.

Critical reception
Billboard praised the album, calling Hartford one of the era's "great songwriters."

Track listing
All songs written by John Hartford.

Side 1
"California Earthquake" – 3:00
"Gentle on My Mind" – 3:00
"Natural to Be Gone" – 1:46
"The Six O'Clock Train and a Girl with Green Eyes" – 2:38
"A Simple Thing As Love" – 2:54

Side 2
"Mouth to Mouth Resuscitation" – 1:50
"I Would Not Be Here" – 2:19
"Front Porch" – 1:56
Untangle Your Mind" – 2:02
"Like Unto a Mockingbird" – 2:46
"The Tall Tall Grass" – 2:20

Personnel
John Hartford – banjo, guitar, fiddle, vocals

Production
 Felton Jarvis – producer
 Jim Malloy – recording engineer
 Al Pachucki – recording engineer
 Cam Mullins – arranger, Tracks 4 and 5 on Side 1

References

John Hartford albums